Sunan Yugur Autonomous County is an autonomous county under the administration of the prefecture-level city of Zhangye, Gansu Province, China, bordering Qinghai province to the south. It is home to the majority of the Yugur ethnic group.

The autonomous county is ethnically diverse, with large populations of Han Chinese, Yugurs, and Tibetans, with none comprising a majority.

Sùnán Yugur Autonomous County consists of three separate areas: Mínghua District, situated in the plains in the northwest, and Huángcheng District, situated in the mountains in the southeast, are separated from the main part of the county.

Toponymy 
The autonomous county's name refers to its location to the south of Suzhou, the former name of Jiuquan.

History 
Sunan Yugur Autonomous County was established in 1954.

Geography 
Sunan Yugur Autonomous County is located in the middle portion of the Hexi Corridor, along the northern foot of Qilian Mountains.

The autonomous county is bordered by Bairi Tibetan Autonomous County to the east and Subei Mongol Autonomous County to the west. The autonomous county's northern border is formed by Liangzhou District, Suzhou District, Jiayuguan, and Yumen from east to west. Sunan Yugur Autonomous County is bordered by Menyuan Hui Autonomous County of Qinghai to the south.

The physical geography of the region includes many mountains, canyons, and alluvial plains. The southern portion of the autonomous county is more mountainous, while the northern portion includes more plains. Prominent mountains within the autonomous county include Suzhu Lian and the July 1 Glacier. Major rivers that flow through Sunan Yugur Autonomous County include the Ruo Shui, the Shiyang River, and the Shule River.

Climate 
Sunan Yugur Autonomous County has an semi-arid alpine climate, with cold winters and cool summers. There is more precipitation in summer months than winter months. The autonomous county has short frost-free periods, and a high amount of sunshine.

Administrative divisions
Sunan Yugur Autonomous County is divided into 3 towns, 2 townships, 3 ethnic townships and 2 other township-level divisions. These township-level divisions then, in turn, administer 102 village-level divisions.

Demographics 
As of 2021, Sunan Yugur Autonomous County has a population of 39,283, an increase of 25 people from 2020. This figure is up from 35,869 in 1999, and 35,500 in 1993. The autonomous county recorded 14,932 households that year, down 56 from 2020, giving it an average household size of 2.63 people.

Ethnic groups 
Sunan Yugur Autonomous County is an ethnically diverse area. No single ethnic group comprises a majority of its population as of 2021. The largest ethnic groups in the autonomous county are the Han Chinese, Yugurs, and Tibetans. Other groups with sizable populations within the autonomous county include the Hui, the Monguor, and the Mongols. A large amount of ethnic Tibetans lived in the now-defunct Xishui Tibetan Ethnic Township.

Historic ethnic composition

Economy 
Sunan Yugur Autonomous County had a total gross domestic product (GDP) of 3.306 billion renminbi (RMB) as of 2021, an increase of 5.8% from 2020. Of this, the primary sector constituted 829 million RMB (25.08% of total GDP), an increase of 7.2% from 2020; the secondary sector totaled 1.244 billion RMB (37.63% of total GDP), an increase of 5.2% from 2020; the tertiary sector totaled 1.232 billion RMB (37.27% of total GDP), an increase of 5.3% from 2020. Total retail sales totaled 617 million RMB in 2021, a 12.3% increase from 2020. In 2021, the per capita disposable income of the autonomous county's urban residents totaled 33,531 RMB, a 7.5% increase from 2020; the disposable income of rural residents totaled 21,783 RMB, a 10.0% increase from 2020.

Tourism accounts for a significant portion of Sunan Yugur Autonomous County's economy. In 2021, the autonomous county received a total of 3.15 million tourists, a 23.7% increase from 2020. Total revenue from tourism totaled 1.572 billion RMB, a 29.2% increase from 2020.

Sunan Yugur Autonomous county is home to a sizable mining industry, and rich in deposits of coal, copper, iron, tungsten, chromium, manganese, and other mineral resources.

Government and politics 
The town of  serves as the seat of government.

See also 

 Hexi Corridor
 Yugurs

References

County-level divisions of Gansu
Zhangye
Autonomous counties of the People's Republic of China